Tertry is a commune in the Somme department in Hauts-de-France in northern France.

Geography

History
Tertry was the site of the battle of Tertry in 687, where Pepin of Herstal defeated Berchar, mayor of the palace of Neustria.

In 1920, British soldiers built a bridge across the Omignon at Tertry.

Population

See also
Communes of the Somme department

References

Communes of Somme (department)